The 1971 Mediterranean Games football tournament was the 6th edition of the Mediterranean Games men's football tournament. The football tournament was held in İzmir, Turkey between the 6–16 October 1971 as part of the 1971 Mediterranean Games.

Participating teams
The following countries have participated for the final tournament:

Venues

Squads

Tournament
All times local : Time zone (UTC+3)

Group stage

Group A

Tunisia won group on draw.

Group B

Match abandoned at 1–0, Morocco walked off after two players sent off. Morocco disqualified and all their results annulled

Knockout stage

Fifth place match

Third place match

Final

Tournament classification

External links
Mediterranean Games 1971 (İzmir, Turkey) - rsssf.com

1971
Football
1971–72 in French football
1971–72 in Yugoslav football
1971–72 in Turkish football
1971–72 in Greek football
1971 in African football
1971 in Asian football
1971